Stadion  is a multilingual academic journal covering the history of sport. The editors-in-chief are Manfred Lämmer, Thierry Terret, and Maureen Smith (German Sport University Cologne).

External links 
 

History journals
Publications established in 1975
Multilingual journals
Biannual journals
Sports mass media in Germany